Zdzisław Kasprzak (December 16, 1910 in Poznań – August 5, 1971 in Poznań) was a Polish basketball player who competed in the 1936 Summer Olympics.

He was part of the Polish basketball team, which finished fourth in the Olympic tournament. He played four matches.

References

External links
profile

1910 births
1971 deaths
Polish men's basketball players
Olympic basketball players of Poland
Basketball players at the 1936 Summer Olympics
Sportspeople from Poznań
Lech Poznań (basketball) players